Johnny Alfonso Paredes Isambert (2 September 1962 – 5 November 2020) was a Venezuelan second baseman in Major League Baseball (MLB) who played for the Montreal Expos (1988; 1990) and Detroit Tigers (1990–1991). He also played in Japan in 1992 for the Yakult Swallows. Listed at 5' 11", 165 lb., he batted and threw right-handed. He also played with Aguilas del Zulia of the LVBP between 1982 and 1993.

In a three-year career in the Majors, Paredes was a .211 hitter with one home run and 11 RBI in 60 games. Paredes died on November 5, 2020, at the age of 58 of a cancer related illness.

See also
 List of Major League Baseball players from Venezuela

References

External links
, or Retrosheet, or Mexican Baseball League, or Venezuelan Baseball League

1962 births
2020 deaths
Águilas del Zulia players
Caribes de Oriente players
Detroit Tigers players
Helena Phillies players
Indianapolis Indians players
Jacksonville Expos players
Major League Baseball players from Venezuela
Major League Baseball second basemen
Mexican League baseball players
Montreal Expos players
Nippon Professional Baseball second basemen
Rojos del Águila de Veracruz players
Spartanburg Spinners players
Sportspeople from Maracaibo
Tiburones de La Guaira players
Toledo Mud Hens players
Venezuelan expatriate baseball players in Canada
Venezuelan expatriate baseball players in Japan
Venezuelan expatriate baseball players in Mexico
Venezuelan expatriate baseball players in the United States
Yakult Swallows players
West Palm Beach Expos players
Venezuelan expatriate baseball players in Italy
Parma Baseball Club players
Deaths from cancer in Venezuela